Nicole Johnson may refer to:

 Nicole Johnson (monster truck driver) (born 1974), American professional monster truck driver and competition rock crawler
 Nicole Johnson (Miss America) (born 1974), Miss America 1999, diabetes advocate
 Nicole Randall Johnson (born 1973), American comic actress
 Nicole Johnson (Miss California USA) (born 1985), Miss California USA 2010 (aka Nicole Michele Phelps)
 Nicole Johnson (songwriter), American songwriter